Al-Mashawilah is a sub-district located in the Al-Ma'afer District, Taiz Governorate, Yemen. Al-Mashawilah had a population of 17,417 according to the 2004 census.

References  

Sub-districts in Al-Ma'afer District